The O.A.E. Blyberg House is a historic building located in Pelican Rapids, Minnesota, United States. Blyberg was a merchant and land speculator who settled here in 1871. He opened the first store in town and served as its first postmaster. His success is exemplified by this 2½-story brick residence that Blyberg had built in 1884 on a large tree-filled lot, and it remains one of the finest houses in town. The Italianate structure features an irregular plan, locally produced cream-colored brick, a low hipped roof with brackets and pendants, a wrap-around porch, and dressed stone window sills. The second story on the back of the house, the balconies on the east and west elevation, a single-story room on the east side, and the pedimented gabled dormers (except for the one on the north elevation) were added in a 1901-1902 renovation. The house was listed on the National Register of Historic Places in 1984.

References

Houses completed in 1884
Italianate architecture in Minnesota
Houses in Otter Tail County, Minnesota
National Register of Historic Places in Otter Tail County, Minnesota
Houses on the National Register of Historic Places in Minnesota